Minnesota State Highway 87 (MN 87) is a  highway in north-central and northwest Minnesota, which runs from its interchange with U.S. Highway 10 at Frazee and continues east to its eastern terminus at its intersection with State Highway 84 in Ponto Lake Township,  east of Backus and  southwest of Longville.

Route description
Highway 87 serves as an east–west route in north-central and northwest Minnesota between Frazee,  Menahga, and Backus.

The route passes through the following forests:

 Badoura State Forest in southeast Hubbard County
 Foot Hills State Forest in Cass County

The eastern terminus of Highway 87 intersects State Highway 84 about midway between Pine River and Longville.

Highway 87 has short concurrencies with State Highway 64 at Badoura and Highway 371 at Backus.  Highway 87 also runs together with U.S. Highway 71 at Menahga, south of Park Rapids.

Highway 87 is also known as Lake Street in the city of Frazee.  The route is also known as West Main Street in Menahga.  Highway 87 follows Front Street and Washburn Avenue in Backus.

History
Highway 87 was authorized in 1933.

The route still had gravel sections in 1953.  Highway 87 was completely paved by 1960.

Major intersections

References

087
Transportation in Becker County, Minnesota
Transportation in Wadena County, Minnesota
Transportation in Hubbard County, Minnesota
Transportation in Cass County, Minnesota